The Hawaii Soccer Association is the governing body of soccer in the state of Hawaii.

Organization and governance 
The Hawaii Soccer Association is composed of nine officers and directors who lead the organization.

 Carrie Nelson — President
 Sergio Bolioli — Vice President
 Michael Waring — Treasurer 
 Leona Vik — State Registrar
 Laurie Baker — Secretary
 Frank Doyle — Tournaments Director
 Linda Goeas — Director at Large
 Roger Thomas — Director at Large
 Jack Sullivan — Honorary Board Member

Divisions 
The Hawaii Soccer Association is divided into several different regional associations based on island. Each island administers its own soccer leagues.

 Kauai Soccer Association
 Maui Soccer Association
 Men's Island Soccer Organization

References

External links
 Hawaii Soccer Association official site

State Soccer Associations
Soccer in Hawaii
1975 establishments in Hawaii
Organizations based in Hawaii
Sports organizations established in 1975